Indo-Mauritians are Mauritians who trace their ethnic ancestry to Indian subcontinent or other parts of South Asia.

History
During the administration of the French East India Company (until 1767) and subsequent French rule at least 12,000 workers arrived from India between 1721 and 1810 before the abolition of slavery. These first Indian immigrants came from various parts of India such as Pondicherry, Karikal, Yanaon, Bengal and others. They worked under contract as skilled stonemasons, blacksmiths, and carpenters although hundreds of them were slaves. After the legislative changes of 1767 these Indian immigrants were allowed to start businesses, buy land and own slaves.

Following the November 1810 British Invasion from the northern coast, the island came under British rule. With the liberation of about 65,000 African and Malagasy slaves after the 1833 abolition of slavery the Franco-Mauritian plantation owners and sugar oligarchs resorted to indentured labourers, or Coolies, from various parts of India to work in their fields. Between 1834 and 1920, nearly 700,000 Indian indentured laborers arrived at Aapravasi ghat, an embankment located in the harbor of Port-Louis. Mauritius thus became the British colony's largest recipient of indentured migrants. Indentured labourers were mostly brought from the Bhojpuri speaking regions of Bihar and Uttar Pradesh, with a large number of Tamils, Telugus and Marathis amongst them. The descendants of these indentured labourers make up two-thirds of the island's current population.

As free immigrants, these later arrivals were commonly employed by the British in the armed forces, police forces, as security personnel with a substantial portion of immigrants from Gujarat and Sindh arriving as traders, businessmen, and merchants.

In the late 19th to early 20th century, Chinese men in Mauritius married Indian women due to both a lack of Chinese women and the higher numbers of Indian women on the island. The 1921 census in Mauritius counted that Indian women there had a total of 148 children fathered by Chinese men. These Chinese were mostly traders.

Demographics
Today the population consists of mainly Hindus with Muslim, Christian, Buddhist and Baháʼí Faith minorities. The mother tongue of almost all Mauritians is the Mauritian Creole, while a minority of Indo-Mauritians still use both their ancestral language and Creole at home. Indo-Mauritian use their ancestral languages mostly in religious activities, some of them include Bhojpuri, Tamil, Hindi, Marathi, Telugu and Urdu.

As from age six, all Mauritian children must learn a third language at school (French and English are already compulsory). The languages learnt in decreasing order are Hindi, Urdu, Tamil,  Chinese, Marathi, Telugu and Bhojpuri. Mauritian Creoles can opt for Mauritian Creole as the third language. Choice is usually based on ethno-religious background with Hindi, Tamil, Telugu and Marathi chosen by Hindus who belong to the respective ethnicities and Urdu by Muslims from the Indian Subcontinent.

Indian influence
Indo-Mauritians have influenced Mauritian culture, dominating the economic, public sector and political faces of the island. Mauritian politics have been historically dominated by the Indo-Mauritian community due to their majority as a whole on the electoral platform. All presidents except Karl Offmann and all prime ministers except for Paul Berenger have been members of the community. Most Hindu celebrations are public holidays. Indian influence is felt in religion, cuisine and arts. Indian influence is also felt on music wherein the island has its own groups of Bhojpuri and Tamil bands. Indian films are also widely popular.

Notable people

Amode Ibrahim Atchia
Viveka Babajee
Sheila Bappoo
Ananda Devi
Rashid Beebeejaun
Sunil Benimadhu
Basdeo Bissoondoyal
Sookdeo Bissoondoyal
Shakeel Mohamed
Harish Boodhoo
Sudhir Hazareesingh
Satcam Boolell
Dayendranath Burrenchobay
Angidi Chettiar
Shirin Aumeeruddy-Cziffra
Kishore Deerpalsing
Alan Ganoo
Hurrylall Goburdhun
Ramchundur Goburdhun
Ameenah Gurib-Fakim
Maya Hanoomanjee
Mahesh Jadu
Kher Jagatsingh
Suella Braverman
Anerood Jugnauth
Pravind Jugnauth
Misha Mansoor
Abdool Razack Mohamed
Prem Nababsing
William Newton
Ariranga Govindasamy Pillay
Navin Ramgoolam 
Seewoosagur Ramgoolam 
Nathacha Appanah
Veerasamy Ringadoo
Prithvirajsing Roopun
Rama Sithanen
Harry Krishnan Tirvengadum
Khal Torabully
Cassam Uteem
Dev Virahsawmy
 Vikash Dhorasoo

Sports
Football is the most popular sport amongst Mauritians. Vikash Dhorasoo, who played for French football team, is of Indo-Mauritian origin.

See also
 Mauritian of African origin
 Mauritian of French origin
 Mauritian of Chinese origin
 Mauritian Creole
 Indian diaspora in Africa
 India–Mauritius relations

Notes and references

Footnotes

Notations

Mauritius: History, Geography, Government, and Culture
South Asian Indentured Labor - Online Archive of Research and Resources - an online archive and living syllabus of text-based resources related to Indian indentureship, with country-specific resources related to Indians indentured to Mauritius

 
 
Asian diaspora in Mauritius